The Revolution was a professional wrestling villainous stable in World Championship Wrestling (WCW).

History 
The Revolution was formed by Chris Benoit and Dean Malenko (leftovers from the last incarnation of the Four Horsemen), Perry Saturn (leftover from The Flock) and Shane Douglas on the July 29, 1999 edition of WCW Thunder. When the group first came together as fan favorites, it was with the idea that they were a group of younger wrestlers who had felt slighted by WCW management, never giving them the chance to be stars, while always giving older, more established wrestlers the top spots.

The concept held some truth, and in reality the stable was actually made up of close friends, as Douglas, Benoit, Malenko and Saturn knew each other from their days in Extreme Championship Wrestling (ECW). Douglas, Benoit, and Malenko also were the original Triple Threat stable in ECW, while Saturn was part of The Eliminators with John Kronus. During a house show on September 11 at the Baltimore Arena, three days after the death of WCW referee Mark Curtis, Douglas, Benoit and Malenko paid tribute to their friend and dedicated the show to him.

In October of that year, after Vince Russo became head writer, the gimmick of the group changed to one that was anti-America and anti-government. This was established with Benoit taking a microphone, looking toward the entrance stage, and stating that they were "tired of the politics going on in the back". This blurred the line between storyline and real-life in regards to how WCW was being managed.

The group even went so far as to create their own flag and claim to have left the United States and formed their own government. Their theme music had a guitar and percussion sound very similar to Marilyn Manson's "The Beautiful People".

Benoit and Malenko left the group in October, but Malenko turned on Benoit in a setup where Malenko had never really left The Revolution. The Revolution then added Asya and feuded with The Filthy Animals. The Revolution kidnapped Torrie Wilson and put her freedom up in a match against The Filthy Animals, which they lost.

In January 2000, Malenko, Saturn and Benoit left WCW along with Eddie Guerrero in a dispute with management and formed The Radicalz in the World Wrestling Federation (WWF, now WWE), while Douglas took a hiatus, before returning to WCW in April.

Championships and accomplishments 
 World Championship Wrestling
 WCW World Television Championship (1 time) – Chris Benoit
 WCW United States Heavyweight Championship (1 time) – Chris Benoit

World Championship Wrestling teams and stables